Fairview is an extinct town in Chattooga County, in the U.S. state of Georgia.

History
The community was named from scenic and "fair" views of nearby mountains.

References

Geography of Chattooga County, Georgia
Ghost towns in Georgia (U.S. state)